Dudinka Airport  is a small airport in Krasnoyarsk krai, Russia located  south of Dudinka. It services small transport aircraft.

References
RussianAirFields.com

Airports built in the Soviet Union
Airports in Krasnoyarsk Krai